Hymns for Pentecost are hymns dedicated to the Christian feast of Pentecost, or Whitsun. Along with Christmas and Easter, it is a high holiday, dedicated to the Holy Spirit, or Holy Ghost. Hymns have been written from the 9th century to contemporary.

History 
First hymns were sung in Latin, and in plainchant. An early hymn was Veni Creator Spiritus (Come, Creator Spirit), attributed to Rabanus Maurus who lived in the 9th century. It was used in the liturgy not only for Pentecost, but also for vespers between Ascension Day and Pentecost, and for occasions such as ordination and profession. Many later hymns in different languages are based on it. An early sequence for Pentecost was Veni Sancte Spiritus (Come, Holy Spirit).

With the Reformation, hymns were often written in the native language. Martin Luther wrote several hymns dedicated to Pentecost specifically, based on earlier models. His first published hymn was "Komm, Gott Schöpfer, Heiliger Geist", a paraphrase of Veni Creator Spiritus, which appeared in the Erfurt Enchiridion in 1524.

Hymns in English include "Come, Holy Ghost, our souls inspire", a paraphrase of Veni Creator Spiritus by Bishop John Cosin, published in the 1662 Book of Common Prayer and used also for coronations of English royals, and "Breathe on Me, Breath of God", written by Edwin Hatch in 1876.

Table 
In the following sortable table, the entries appear first chronologically based on writing or publishing of the text. The following columns feature the language, a translation of the beginning, the author of the text, a year of writing when known or assumed, the source of the melody, its year, a publication date followed by a hymnal name, and notes. The notes may contain a reference, a number in a current hymnal, such as the 2013 German Catholic hymnal Gotteslob or its previous edition of 1975 (GL), and the German Protestant hymnal Evangelisches Gesangbuch (EG), also notes about a model.

References

Cited sources

External links 

Hymns for Pentecost
Holiday songs lists